Georgy Sergeevich Zhiritsky (26 September 1883 - 4 June 1966) was a Soviet scientist in the field of Rocket engines, and a professor.

Biography 
He was born in 1883 in the Tula Governorate.

In 1915 he graduated from the Kiev Polytechnic Institute. Since 1918 he worked at the institute. At the age of 32 he is promoted to professor. In 1926 and 1927, during his scientific trips to Germany, he became acquainted with the practice of German turbine construction.

In 1937, arrested on a false case of wrecking, sent to work in Sharashka, at the Tushino Aircraft Building Plant, where he is engaged in the design of aircraft engines, and specifically the design of the Centrifugal-type supercharge.

In 1944, according to the letter of Lavrenty Beria, who asks Stalin to release of 35 highly distinguished prisoners of experts with the removal of the criminal records, he gets freedom.

Then he works as an aircraft constructor, he takes up promising models of jet engines and also teaches at the Kazan Aviation Institute. Zhiritsky's main scientific works are related to heat engineering, turbine construction and rocket engine construction; they are devoted to the theory and design of steam engines, steam and gas turbines, jet engines.

Awarded with a large number of orders and medals. In 1970, in honor of the professor, the crater on the Moon was named.

Literature 
 Паровые машины. — Киев: Изд-во Исполбюро Пролетстуда КПИ, 1925. — 434 с.
 Паровые турбины. — Киев: Изд-во Исполбюро КПИ, 1927. — 387 с.
 Газовые турбины. — М.: Госэнергоиздат, 1948. — 504 с.
 Авиационные газовые турбины. — М.: Оборонгиз, 1950. — 512 с.

References 

Academic staff of Moscow Power Engineering Institute
Soviet engineers
Kyiv Polytechnic Institute alumni
1883 births
1966 deaths